Masta (Nepali: मष्टा ) is a Gaupalika(Nepali: गाउपालिका ; gaupalika) in Bajhang District in the Sudurpashchim Province of far-western Nepal. 
Masta has a population of 14951.The land area is 109.24 km2.

References

Rural municipalities in Bajhang District
Rural municipalities of Nepal established in 2017